Ririn Amelia (born 24 December 1993) is an Indonesian badminton player affiliated with Djarum club. She was the gold medalist at the 2011 Asian Junior Championships in the mixed doubles event with her partner Lukhi Apri Nugroho.

Achievements

Asian Junior Championships 
Mixed doubles

BWF International Challenge/Series (2 titles, 6 runners-up) 
Women's doubles

Mixed doubles

  BWF International Challenge tournament
  BWF International Series tournament
  BWF Future Series tournament

Performance timeline

Indonesian team 
 Junior level

Individual competitions

Junior level 
Girls' doubles

Mixed doubles

Senior level

Women's doubles

Mixed doubles

References

External links 
 

1993 births
Living people
People from Padang
Sportspeople from West Sumatra
Indonesian female badminton players
21st-century Indonesian women
20th-century Indonesian women